Dzmitry Dziatsuk (born 9 April 1985) is a retired Belarusian triple jumper.

Achievements

References

1985 births
Living people
Belarusian male triple jumpers